{{DISPLAYTITLE:D2-like receptor}}
The D2-like receptors are a subfamily of dopamine receptors that bind the endogenous neurotransmitter dopamine. The D2-like subfamily consists of three G-protein coupled receptors that are coupled to Gi/Go and mediate inhibitory neurotransmission, of which include D2, D3, and D4. For more information, please see the respective main articles of the individual subtypes:

See also 
 D1-like receptor

References 

Dopamine receptors